Brindisi Montagna, also spelled Brindisi di Montagna is an Arbëreshë town and comune in the province of Potenza, in the Southern Italian region of Basilicata.

Geography
The municipality borders with Albano di Lucania, Anzi, Potenza, Tricarico (MT), Trivigno and Vaglio Basilicata.

References

External links

Arbëresh settlements

Cities and towns in Basilicata